Sohail Qaiser (1965 – 14 August 2016) was a Pakistani professional squash player.

Sohail Qaiser was born during 1965 and lived in Lahore, Pakistan. He won the World Junior Championship in 1982 and British under-23 Open at Wembley in 1982. He became a full Pakistan international in the mid-eighties. He was also part of the Pakistan team that won the 1985 Men's World Team Squash Championships.

Sohail Qaiser lost his battle against lung cancer on August 14, 2016.

References

External links
 

Pakistani male squash players
1965 births
2016 deaths
20th-century Pakistani people
21st-century Pakistani people
Deaths from lung cancer in Pakistan